Arthur Evans (born August 22, 1947) is an American rower. He competed in the men's coxed eight event at the 1968 Summer Olympics.  He graduated from Harvard University and University of Cincinnati.  He later taught at University of Cincinnati, Texas Tech University, University of California, Davis, Eastern Virginia Medical School and the University of Kentucky.

References

1947 births
Living people
American male rowers
Olympic rowers of the United States
Rowers at the 1968 Summer Olympics
Sportspeople from Tucson, Arizona
Harvard Crimson rowers
University of Cincinnati College of Medicine alumni
University of Cincinnati faculty
Texas Tech University Health Sciences Center faculty
University of California, Davis faculty
Eastern Virginia Medical School faculty
University of Kentucky faculty